Demattè is a surname. Notable people with the surname include:

Claudio Demattè (1942–2004), Italian economist 
Luca Demattè (born 1990), Italian pair skater